Presidente Médici may refer to:
Emílio Garrastazu Médici, President of Brazil from 1969 to 1974
Presidente Médici, Maranhão, a municipality in Maranhão, Brazil 
Presidente Médici, Rondônia, a municipality in Rondônia, Brazil
Presidente Médici International Airport, a defunct airport in Brazil